Simon Richard James Fell (born 9 February 1981) is an English Conservative Party politician, who has been the Member of Parliament (MP) for Barrow and Furness since the 2019 general election.

Early life and career 
Fell was born in Preston in 1981, the son of Peter and Meriel Fell. He graduated with honours from the University of Warwick with a bachelor's degree in English literature. After his studies, he worked in the telecommunications sector, running a communications business, Irton-Fell Consultants, from 2006 to 2008.

He was then a regulatory affairs manager for Hutchison H3g from 2008 to 2011. He then began a period working for Cifas, a not-for-profit anti-fraud organisation. From 2011 to 2019, he was assistant director of strategy and policy, and in 2019, became director of external relations. Fell was chair of Barrow and District Credit Union from 2017 to 2019.

Political career 

Fell contested the marginal seat of Barrow and Furness at the 2015 and 2017 general elections, before winning the seat at his third attempt in 2019. At a 2015 hustings in Ulverston, he described himself as 'mildly-Eurosceptic'. However, he has since made clear that he supports Brexit, stating before his election in 2019 that "Brexit was the right decision for Barrow and Furness – it now needs a Conservative majority to see it delivered". He is the first Conservative MP to be elected for the seat since 1987.

In 2020, Fell supported the Transport Secretary's decision to revoke the franchise of Arriva Rail North "after years of poor performance."

In 2020, Fell organised a successful petition to prevent the closure of the Askam GP Practice.

Fell has served on the Home Affairs Select Committee since March 2020.

Fell withdrew support of Former Prime Minister Boris Johnson on July 6, 2022 due to the recent controversies including Partygate and the Chris Pincher scandal

Personal life 
In 2009, Fell married Pippa; the couple have a son and daughter. Outside politics, he lists his recreations as hill walking and writing.

In December 2021, Fell tested positive for COVID-19.

References

External links

Living people
1981 births
UK MPs 2019–present
Conservative Party (UK) MPs for English constituencies
Alumni of the University of Warwick
Cumbria MPs
British Eurosceptics